The 1947 Chicago Rockets season was their second in the All-America Football Conference. The team failed to improve upon their previous output of 5-6-3, winning only one game. They failed to qualify for the playoffs for the second consecutive season.

The team's statistical leaders included Sam Vacanti with 1,571 passing yards, Bill Daley with 447 rushing yards, and Ray Ramsey with 768 receiving yards and 60 points scored (39 extra points, 15 field goals).

Season schedule

Division standings

References

Chicago Rockets seasons
Chicago Rockets